Los Angeles Mission College is a public community college in Los Angeles, California. It is part of the Los Angeles Community College District and it is accredited by the WASC Accrediting Commission for Community and Junior Colleges.

History

Los Angeles Mission College is the ninth and youngest college established in the Los Angeles Community College District. It was first located in high schools, churches, office buildings, shopping centers, and other locations scattered throughout the city of San Fernando and the Sylmar neighborhood of Los Angeles, and opened its doors to the public in February 1975 with approximately twelve hundred students. The graduating class of 1975 consisted of a single student, who had transferred to the college that semester. Within two years, over 3,000 students were taking classes in fifty different disciplines, including Administration of Justice, Business, Chemistry, Chicano Studies, English, Family and Consumer Studies, Geography, Journalism, Microbiology, Real Estate, and Zoology. The college then outgrew its locations and found a permanent location for the campus at Hubbard and Eldridge in the northeast part of the Sylmar neighborhood instead.

Before the Los Angeles Community College District and Mission College purchased the 22 acres of land, it was slated for a public middle school on Hubbard and Eldridge. The permanent campus had only a campus center with a library and the main instructional building with a culinary arts department & classes, a cafeteria, and administrative offices.

Seven years after the permanent campus opened in 1991, a new Library and Learning Resource Center opened in 1997 and relieved the old library in the Campus Center of LA Mission College. After the new library opened and built in 1997, the large indoor area in the Campus Center where the old library was turned into an event space with meeting rooms, much like a convention center. In 2002, Mission College constructed a collaborative studies building to house more classes on the campus. By 2004, the Center for Child Development Studies building was built and opened on the permanent campus.

By 2008, the campus opened a new parking structure on the south end of the main campus, accommodating the influx of students commuting to the campus. Also in 2008, The college broke ground on the construction of a new cafeteria, student store, and culinary arts institute building at LA Mission College. In 2009, the college opened the Heath, Athletics, and Fitness building on its new east campus property, relieving the physical education classes that once housed in the storefronts of shopping centers in Sylmar. In 2009, Mission College began a shuttle service between the main campus and the east campus. The old sheriff's building at the college was demolished and moved into temporary bungalow buildings. By the Fall of 2009, ground had broken on the new Media Arts building at Mission College and construction began on the new building.

By spring 2011, construction began on the new Center for Math and Science building at the college's East Campus. Also in that same year, the anime club at LA Mission College began by ASO, and the college's anime club was at the height of its popularity in the fall of 2011. Also in the fall of 2011, the Los Angeles Community College District purchased an abandoned residential property on Hubbard across from the main campus and built a parking lot and asphalt areas for bungalows. The new Culinary Arts Institute building with a new cafeteria and student store was built and opened in spring 2011, relieving the old cafeteria in the Instructional Building; and the old student store in the Campus Services building. In 2011, the construction of the Media Arts building was delayed for one year until April 2012.

In 2012, the Center for Math and Science building opened at east campus in fall 2012. In the spring of 2012, the first main walkway on the campus was repaved in concrete due to a new storm drain placed underneath. The LA Mission College shuttle service was canceled in fall 2012, due to a lack of funding. During the summer of 2012, construction on the Media Arts building resumed.

Over the years from 2014 to 2016, The ASO's anime club declined in popularity and lack of interest and was canceled in fall 2015. By spring 2017, the new Media Arts building had finally been built and opened after many delays and budget issues. By December 2017, a new transit center for the Metro Local bus routes 234 and 230 was built and began service on the main campus next to the Media Arts building, changing the bus routes and serving the east campus. In January 2018, Mission College expanded its campus and added a Sunland/ Tujunga campus location at a shopping center on Foothill Blvd.

Academics

In addition to its academic degrees, Mission College also provides vocational education and training in which students may receive certificates in Child Development, Family and Consumer Studies, Paralegal, and Computer Applications.

Athletics 
The college's athletic teams are known as the Eagles. LAMC competes as a member of the California Community College Athletic Association (CCCAA) in the Western State Conference (WSC). The college currently fields eight varsity teams: men's sports include baseball, cross country, soccer while women's sports include basketball, cross country, softball, tennis, and volleyball.

Notable alumni 
Miguel González (pitcher)
Ivan Becerra
Jhonny Bravo
Gerardo Bravo

References

External links 
 

California Community Colleges
Universities and colleges in the San Fernando Valley
Educational institutions established in 1975
Schools accredited by the Western Association of Schools and Colleges
Universities and colleges in Los Angeles
Sylmar, Los Angeles
1975 establishments in California
Two-year colleges in the United States